Herbert F. DeSimone (September 5, 1929 – November 27, 2013) was an American lawyer and politician from Rhode Island. He served as the 64th Attorney General of Rhode Island and as President Nixon's Assistant Secretary of Transportation for the Environment and Urban System.

Early life
DeSimone was born in Providence, Rhode Island, the only child of Florie DeSimone and Lena (Capuano) DeSimone. He attended La Salle Academy before graduating from Brown University in 1951. While at Brown, DeSimone played college football and was defensive tackle for the 1949 team that was inducted into the Brown University Hall of Fame.

In 1954, he received his law degree from Columbia University Law School and was admitted to the Rhode Island bar. He began the practice of law in Rhode Island.

Political career
As a Republican, DeSimone served as Attorney General of Rhode Island from 1967-1971. He was the 1970 Republican nominee for Governor of Rhode Island but lost the election to Frank Licht. Shortly after his defeat, President Richard Nixon nominated DeSimone to be assistant secretary of the United States Department of Transportation for Environment and Urban System. He served in that position from 1971 to 1972. In 1972 he ran for Governor of Rhode Island again against Philip W. Noel, and was defeated. He then returned to the private practice of law.

In August 1976, President Gerald Ford nominated DeSimone to succeed Edward William Day as  judge for the United States District Court for the District of Rhode Island but United States Senator Edward Kennedy blocked the nomination.

In 1985, DeSimone was appointed Director of the Rhode Island Department of Transportation by Governor Edward D. DiPrete. He also served as Director of the Providence Industrial Development Corporation and General Counsel for the Rhode Island Housing and Finance Corporation.

In 2002 he was awarded the Neil J. Houston Award for contributions to the Criminal Justice systems and Public Interest. He was also awarded Man of the Year by Engineering News Record and Man of the Year by the Italo-American Club of Rhode Island.

DeSimone was a longtime advisor and mentor to Providence Mayor Buddy Cianci. Cianci started his career in DeSimone's Attorney General office, and worked on DeSimone's 1970 and 1972 gubernatorial campaigns. DeSimone was present at Cianci's home the night in March 1983 when Cianci was accused of beating Raymond DeLeo. DeSimone testified in Cianci's trial, in which Cianci pleaded no contest to assault and assault with a dangerous weapon.

Personal life
DeSimone and his wife Sally Reynolds DeSimone had three children: Herbert DeSimone, Douglas DeSimone and  Deborah DeSimone.

DeSimone died in Providence, Rhode Island on November 27, 2013.

References

External links
 
Herbert F. DeSimone-obituary

	

1929 births
2013 deaths
20th-century American lawyers
Politicians from Providence, Rhode Island
La Salle Academy alumni
Brown University alumni
Columbia Law School alumni
Rhode Island Republicans
Rhode Island Attorneys General
Rhode Island lawyers
United States Department of Transportation officials
Nixon administration personnel
Burials in Rhode Island